LCG Entertainment, Inc., doing business as Telltale Games, is an American video game developer and publisher based in Malibu, California. The company was established after the original Telltale Games filed for assignment in October 2018 and were forced to shut down and sell off assets. LCG Entertainment had been able to acquire the rights to much of the original Telltale intellectual property (IP), including branding, games, and game licenses, and announced in August 2019 they would be bringing the old Telltale Games titles back.

History

Founding 

The original Telltale Games had become an established studio in producing episodic adventure games. While its earlier titles were modest successes, the studio had become successful with its release of the licensed property The Walking Dead in 2012. The Walking Dead helped Telltale establish major licenses from other franchises, among which included Batman and the Fables comic.

While the studio continued to build on its successes, the period leading up to 2016 created a lot of internal strife within Telltale, focusing on quantity of titles released over quality, and led to underperforming sales of hastily-produced titles. A major shift in leadership occurred in 2017 to try to refocus the company on improving the quality, with The Walking Dead: The Final Season (the fourth and final in the series) aimed to demonstrate this new approach while the company worked on improving their financial situation. However, after a few major deals fell through in September 2018, Telltale announced its immediate closure, cancelling all current projects, and by October 2018, had filed for assignment.  Several of the licensed properties were taken back by the IP owners; notably The Walking Dead games were acquired by Skybound Entertainment, and the company brought in much of the former Telltale staff to complete The Final Season in 2019.

LCG Entertainment was incorporated under the Delaware General Corporation Law on December 27, 2018, with Jamie Ottilie and Brian Waddle acting as chief executive officer and chief revenue officer, respectively. In February 2019, the company started to negotiate with Sherwood Partners, the company managing the liquidation of Telltale's properties, to acquire much of remaining Telltale licenses and games. Negotiations took over six months, complicated by the number of companies involved in the IP rights. LCG gained a number of investments to help secure the purchase, including Athlon Games and video game industry figures Chris Kingsley, Lyle Hall, and Tobias Sjögren. The acquisition was completed by August 2019.  Athlon Games also became a shareholder in the company as part of the deal.On February 2023, Telltale raised $8 million in funding from Hiro Capital and Skybound Entertainment. 

On August 28, 2019 LCG publicly announced the acquisition of much of the Telltale Games assets, and that it would be doing business as Telltale Games in the future. Among the company's plans were to republish the back catalog of Telltale Games they had acquired, working with Athlon Games as a publishing partner. Subsequently, the company took over the current publishing support of those games it has acquired the license to for digital platforms such as Steam.

Some concern was raised on this announcement in the gaming industry, with some believing that the new company should pay all the debts incurred to the former Telltale Games staff or offer positions to all former employees, while others had called for a boycott on any games released by this company. Ottilie stressed that he had no ties with any of the former Telltale management, nor was in a financial position to meet some of these demands, stating "we cannot right the wrongs of the former company". The company's goal was to start small with a staff of about 30 to 35 people by the end of 2020, using freelancing and outsource contracting until the company established itself, and then expand out. Ottilie asked critics to give them a chance, "Give us some time to ramp up and then judge us by the work we do, not by a past over which we had no part or control." To avoid the issues that plagued the former Telltale, Ottilie said that they will be making sure their business practices are sustainable, not growing too fast to be able to manage costs better. The new company wants to avoid a crunch time environment, "taking a measured and methodical approach to growth in order to ensure we can provide a stable, non-crunch work environment. We are building this into our culture from the outset."

Ottilie also said that while they plan to stay with the episodic release format established by the original Telltale, that in terms of development, they will see such series as a full game from the development side: "If we do release the game in episodes, all of them will be ready before the first one hits the store."

Publishing 
While licenses for games and planned games like The Walking Dead and Stranger Things have since reverted to their original owners, the new Telltale retains licenses for The Wolf Among Us and Batman, as well as the intellectual property for Puzzle Agent. The new Telltale announced its first two new releases in December 2019. The first was a rerelease of Batman: The Telltale Series and Batman: The Enemy Within with a new "Shadows Edition", first released in December 2019. This included both games and added a new noir-like graphics filter, among other quality-of-life improvements. The added filter was also made available as paid downloadable content for those that already owned the game. The second announcement was made at The Game Awards 2019 for The Wolf Among Us 2, a sequel to The Wolf Among Us. While the old Telltale had planned and started work on a sequel to the game, all work had been cancelled when the company closed down. For the revived sequel, the new Telltale brought on AdHoc Studio, a studio formed by former members from Telltale, who will focus on the game's narrative and cinematics, while Telltale will handle the gameplay and transition to the Unreal Engine.

Games

References

External links 
 

2018 establishments in California
American companies established in 2018
Companies based in Los Angeles County, California
Malibu, California
Video game companies based in California
Video game companies established in 2018
Video game development companies
Video game publishers